William Cooper may refer to:

Business
William Cooper (accountant) (1826–1871), founder of Cooper Brothers
William Cooper (businessman) (1761–1840), Canadian businessman
William Cooper (co-operator) (1822–1868), English co-operator
William E. Cooper (civic leader) (1921–2008), prominent businessman in Dallas, Texas
William W. Cooper (1914–2012), management scientist

Government
William B. Cooper (Delaware politician) (1771–1849), American farmer and politician
William B. Cooper (North Carolina politician) (1867–1959), lieutenant governor of North Carolina
William C. Cooper (politician) (1832–1902), US congressman from Ohio
William Cooper (judge) (1754–1809), father of James Fenimore Cooper and founder of Cooperstown, New York
William Cooper (Prince Edward Island politician), Speaker of the Legislative Assembly of Prince Edward Island 
Prentice Cooper (William Prentice Cooper, 1895–1969), Tennessee governor
William Raworth Cooper (1793–1856), US congressman from New Jersey
William Frierson Cooper (1820–1909), lawyer, politician and judge of the Tennessee Supreme Court
Bill Cooper (Georgia politician) (born 1933), American former politician and judge
William Cooper (Australian politician) (1868–1957), member of the Queensland Legislative Assembly
William Prentice Cooper (1870–1961), Speaker of the Tennessee House of Representatives

Literature and arts
William Cooper (novelist) (1910–2002), British novelist
William C. Cooper (actor) (1853–1918), stage and film actor
William Cooper Nell (1816–1874), African-American abolitionist
William Heaton Cooper (1903–1995), British landscape artist
William J. Cooper Jr. (born 1940), American historian
William T. Cooper (1934–2015), Australian natural history illustrator
Revd William Cooper (1824–1892), pseudonym of James Bertram, a Scottish pornography producer
William Sidney Cooper (1854–1927), English landscape artist
William Brown Cooper (1811–1900), American painter
William Y. Cooper (1934–2016), African-American painter, writer and illustrator

Characters
William Cooper, a CIA agent in the 2010 film Red

Science
William Cooper (chemical manufacturer) (1813–1885), British sheep dip manufacturer
William Cooper (conchologist) (1798–1864), American conchologist
William Skinner Cooper (1894–1978), American ecologist

Sports
Bill Cooper (American football) (born 1939), professional football player for the San Francisco 49ers
Bill Cooper (baseball) (1915–1985), American Negro leagues baseball player
Bill Cooper (hurler) (born 1987), Irish hurler
William Cooper (cricketer) (1849–1939), Australian cricketer
William Osborne Cooper (1891–1930), Australian cricketer
Bill Cooper (sailor) (1928–2016), Royal Navy officer, sailor and author
William Cooper (sailor) (1910–1968), Olympic gold medalist of 1932
Billy Cooper (Canadian football) (born 1945), Canadian football player
Billy Cooper (footballer) (1917–?), English footballer
Willie Cooper (1909–1994), Scottish footballer (Aberdeen FC)
Billy Cooper (trumpeter), cricket supporter and trumpet player for the Barmy Army
Willie Cooper (footballer, born 1886), (1886–?} English footballer for Barnsley and Rochdale, see 1910–11 Rochdale A.F.C. season

Other fields
Milton William Cooper (1943–2001), American writer, radio host, and political activist
William Cooper (Aboriginal Australian) (c. 1860–1941), Aboriginal rights leader
William Cooper (Puritan) (fl. 1653), chaplain to Elizabeth of Bohemia and ejected minister
William E. Cooper (university president), president of the University of Richmond (1998–2007)
William Cooper (priest) (1833/34–1909), Church of England priest
William Durrant Cooper (1812–1875), English lawyer and antiquary
William John Cooper (1882–1935), American educator
William Turakiuta Cooper (1886–1949), New Zealand interpreter and land officer
William Cooper (banker), Governor of the Bank of England from 1769 to 1771
William E. Cooper (general) (born 1929), United States Army general

See also
William Couper (disambiguation)
William Cowper (disambiguation)